The 1995 Italian local elections were held on 23 April and 7 May, on 19 November and 3 December.

The elections were strongly won by the new centre-left coalition between the Democratic Party of the Left, led by Massimo D'Alema and the Italian People's Party, heirs of the Christian Democracy party.

The election saw a large defeat of the former Prime Minister Silvio Berlusconi and his centre-right coalition, who won the general election in the previous year.

Municipal elections

Mayoral election results

Provincial elections

References

1995 elections in Italy
1995
April 1995 events in Europe
May 1995 events in Europe
November 1995 events in Europe
December 1995 events in Europe